Stephan Fürstner (born 11 September 1987) is a German former professional footballer who played as a midfielder.

Career

Bayern Munich
For Bayern Munich II, in the 2005–06 season, he scored a goal in 20 appearances, and in the following season, he scored two goals in 26 appearances. He was promoted to Bayern Munich's main squad after playing 20 games in the 2005–06 season for Bayern's second team in the Regionalliga Süd. Fürstner has also played five matches for Germany's U-19 squad and two games for U-21 squad. He saw his first action with Bayern Munich's first-team in their 2006 friendly against New York Red Bulls at Giants Stadium. His only competitive match for the first team was on 5 May 2007 against Borussia Mönchengladbach when he came on in the 87th minute of a 1–1 draw. In his final two seasons at Bayern, he played a 50 matches scoring a goal in each season.

Greuther Fürth
Fürstner signed for Greuther Fürth on 5 June 2009. Since then, he became an integral part of the team which won the Second Bundesliga in 2012.

Union Berlin
Fürstner signed a contract with Union Berlin for two years plus an option year starting in the 2015–16 season. At the end of the 2017–18 season his contract expired and he left the club.

Eintracht Braunschweig
In June 2018, Fürstner signed for Eintracht Braunschweig.

Career statistics

1.Includes German Cup.
2.Includes promotion playoff.

Honours
2. Bundesliga: 2011–12
Bundesliga:  2005–06, 2007–08
DFB-Pokal:  2005–06, 2007–08
DFB-Ligapokal:  2007
IFA Shield: 2005

References

External links
 

1987 births
Living people
Footballers from Munich
Association football midfielders
German footballers
FC Bayern Munich footballers
FC Bayern Munich II players
SpVgg Greuther Fürth players
1. FC Union Berlin players
Eintracht Braunschweig players
1. FSV Mainz 05 II players
1. FSV Mainz 05 players
Germany under-21 international footballers
Bundesliga players
2. Bundesliga players
3. Liga players
Regionalliga players